Ivan Isayev (born 1927) is a Soviet former sports shooter. He competed in the trap event at the 1952 Summer Olympics.

References

External links
 

1927 births
Possibly living people
Soviet male sport shooters
Olympic shooters of the Soviet Union
Shooters at the 1952 Summer Olympics
Place of birth missing (living people)